Ole a cantillation mark found in Psalms, Proverbs, and Job (the  books). Ole is also sometimes used as a stress marker in texts without cantillation.

Total occurrences

References

External links 
 Unicode Character 'HEBREW ACCENT OLE' (U+05AB)

Cantillation marks